Farsia can refer to:

Farsia, a small settlement in northeastern Western Sahara
Farsia (genus), a genus of snout moths (Pyralidae)
n.b. the trilobite genus "Farsia" is now called Wolfartius